The 1892 Indiana Hoosiers football team was an American football team that represented Indiana University Bloomington during the 1892 college football season. Indiana played four games and compiled a 0–4 record, losing games to Butler (6–10), DePauw (forfeit), Purdue (0–68), and Wabash (24–36).

Schedule

References

Indiana
Indiana Hoosiers football seasons
Indiana Hoosiers football